Jodelet astrologue is a French five-act comedy in verse by Antoine Le Metel, sieur d'Ouville, created for the 17th-century comic actor Jodelet and premiered at the Théâtre du Marais in 1646.

Plot 
Jodelet holds from Nise, the maid he loves, love secrets of several suitors and their beauties and since "the language of a valet is worse than a trumpet", but the secrets are soon disclosed.

The unfortunate Nise is ruthlessly hunted by her mistress, but Jodelet has more than one trick in his bag and saves the day: he says he is an astrologer and claims to hold from the revelation of the stars everything Nise told him.

The comedy becomes a satire against astrologers and soothsayers who retailed their nonsense to Parisian onlookers.

Commentary 
Thomas Corneille would draw inspiration from that play to write his Feint Astrologue in 1648, with the difference that Corneille gave the role of the so-called astrologer to the master instead of the servant to make all the incidents of the play more likely, and his Devineresse in 1679.

External links 
The play and its presentations on CÉSAR

Comedy plays
French plays
1646 plays